Turtle Creek may refer to:

Streams
Canada
Turtle Creek (New Brunswick), a tributary of the Petitcodiac River

United States

Turtle Creek (Minnesota), a tributary of the Cedar River
Turtle Creek (New Jersey), a tributary of the Mullica River
Turtle Creek (Little Miami River), a tributary of the Little Miami River in Turtlecreek Township, Warren County, Ohio
Turtle Creek (Monongahela River), a tributary of the Monongahela River, which flows through Turtle Creek, Pennsylvania
Turtle Creek (West Branch Susquehanna River), a tributary of the West Branch Susquehanna River in Union County, Pennsylvania
Turtle Creek (South Dakota)
Turtle Creek (Dallas County, Texas), a tributary of the Trinity River
Turtle Creek (Matagorda County, Texas)
Turtle Creek (Kerr County, Texas), a tributary of the Guadalupe River
Turtle Creek (West Virginia)
Turtle Creek (Wisconsin), a tributary of the Rock River (Mississippi River)
Saltese Creek (Washington), a stream often erroneously called Turtle Creek due to an adjacent housing development of the same name

Places
Canada
Turtle Creek, New Brunswick, a community in Albert County

United States
Turtle Creek Township, Todd County, Minnesota
Turtle Creek Township, Shelby County, Ohio
Turtlecreek Township, Warren County, Ohio
Turtle Creek, Pennsylvania, a borough in Allegheny County
Turtle Creek, Dallas, a neighborhood around the stream in Dallas, Texas
Turtle Creek Boulevard, a road through the Dallas neighborhood
Turtle Creek, West Virginia, an unincorporated community in Boone County
Turtle Creek, Wisconsin, the former name of Beloit, Wisconsin

See also

References